The Mole may refer to:

Film and Television
 The Mole (Krtek)
 De Mol (TV series), a Belgium reality television series licensed internationally known in English as The Mole
 The Mole (Australian TV series), Australian version
 The Mole (British TV series), UK version
 The Mole (American TV series), US version
 Wie is de Mol? (Dutch TV series), NL version
 The Mole (film), 2011 Polish film
 The Mole: Undercover in North Korea, 2020 Danish/Norwegian/Swedish/UK co-production documentary

Fictional entities
 The Mole (Happy Tree Friends), from the cartoon series Happy Tree Friends
 The Mole, from the animated musical film South Park: Bigger, Longer & Uncut
 The Mole, a character in three fantasy novels in Terry Brooks' Shannara series
 The Mole, Gaetan Molière, a character in the animated film Atlantis: The Lost Empire and its sequel, Atlantis: Milo's Return
The Mole, a tunnelling machine in the TV series Thunderbirds

See also
Mole (disambiguation)